Henrik Olesen (b. 1967) is a Danish artist working in Berlin. He has been featured in exhibitions in New York City, Sweden, and Austria.

Olesen was born in Esbjerg. He studied at the Royal Danish Academy of Fine Arts in Copenhagen from 1989 to 1996.

Project 94 at the Museum of Modern Art in early 2011 was Olesen's first U.S. solo museum show, in which, according to Valery Oisteanu in The Brooklyn Rail, "Olesen probes homosexuality’s criminalization, past and present, through the appropriation of source materials and contextual shifts."

Olesen is openly gay, and lives and works in Berlin, Germany.

References

External links 
 Secession Building: Henrik Olesen
 Artnet: Henrik Olesen
 Ludlow 38: Henrik Olesen

Danish contemporary artists
Gay artists
Danish LGBT artists
Royal Danish Academy of Fine Arts alumni
People from Esbjerg
1967 births
Living people